The Anglican Diocese of Mbaise is one of 12 within the Anglican Province of Owerri, itself one of 14 provinces within the Church of Nigeria. The diocese was inaugurated on 30 November 1992, the  inaugural bishop being Cyril Chukwuka Anyanwu who died in 1999, and was succeeded by Bright Joseph Egemasi Ogu. The current bishop is Chamberlain Chinedu Ogunedo, who was consecrated Bishop on 21 February 2010.

Notes

Church of Nigeria dioceses
Dioceses of the Province of Owerri